Orocó is a city in the state of Pernambuco, Brazil. Its population in 2020, according with IBGE, is 15,152 and its area is 554.75 km².

Geography
 State - Pernambuco
 Region - São Francisco Pernambucano
 Boundaries - Parnamirim   (N);  Bahia state  (S);  Cabrobó  (E);  Santa Maria da Boa Vista  (W)
 Area - 554.75 km²
 Elevation - 349 m
 Hydrography - Brigida River
 Vegetation - Caatinga hiperxerófila.
 Climate - Semi arid (Sertão) hot and dry
 Annual average temperature - 26.1 C
 Distance to Recife - 576 km

Economy

The main economic activities in Orocó are based in general on commerce and agribusiness, especially farming of goats, sheep, cattle, donkeys and pigs;  and plantations of onions, melons and bananas.

Economic Indicators

Economy by Sector (2006)

Health Indicators

References

Municipalities in Pernambuco